The Connecticut panhandle is the southwestern appendage of  Connecticut, where it abuts New York State.  It is contained entirely in Fairfield County and includes all of Greenwich, Stamford, New Canaan, and Darien, as well as parts of Norwalk and Wilton. It has some of the most expensive residential real estate in the United States.

The irregularity in the boundary is the result of territorial disputes in the late 17th century, culminating with New York giving up its claim to this area, whose residents considered themselves part of Connecticut. In exchange, New York received an equivalent area extending northwards from Ridgefield, Connecticut, to the Massachusetts border, as well as undisputed claim to Rye, New York.

In exchange, Rye was granted to New York, along with a  strip of land known as the "Oblong" running north from Ridgefield to Massachusetts, alongside the New York counties of Westchester, Putnam, and Dutchess.

See also
Philipse Patent
Border disputes between New York and Connecticut § Settling of the boundary

References

External links
Connecticut's "Panhandle"

Darien, Connecticut
Greenwich, Connecticut
Geography of Stamford, Connecticut
New Canaan, Connecticut
Norwalk, Connecticut
Geography of Westchester County, New York
Border irregularities of the United States
Borders of Connecticut
Geography of Fairfield County, Connecticut
Geography of Dutchess County, New York
Geography of Putnam County, New York